XN may refer to:

 "xn--" in the ASCII representation of internationalized domain names
 Christian, based on the Greek letter Chi used by early Christians
 Nordic Patent Institute (two-letter code XN)
 A nuclear reaction that is expected to produce one or more neutrons 
 Xpress Air (IATA code XN, 2003-2021), an Indonesian airline